Miye D'Oench (born January 26, 1994) is an American former professional ice hockey player for the Metropolitan Riveters in the National Women's Hockey League (NWHL).

Playing career 

Across 135 NCAA games with the Harvard Crimson women's ice hockey program, D'Oench put up 122 points, the 24th player in the university's history to reach 100 points. She was named to the All-ECAC Hockey second team and All-Ivy League second team in her final year.

In 2015, she was drafted 15th overall by the Boston Pride of the NWHL. In April 2016, the Pride traded her rights to the Metropolitan Riveters in exchange for the rights to Alex Carpenter. She would play three seasons with the Riveters, putting up 34 points in 36 games. She would miss half of the 2018 regular season with an ankle injury, before returning for the playoffs as the team won the Isobel Cup.

In March 2019, she retired from professional hockey, to return to university and study to become a lawyer.

International 

D'Oench represented the United States at the 2012 IIHF World Women's U18 Championship, getting two goals in five games as the country won the silver medal. She attended several training camps for the senior national team, including for the 2018 Olympic team, but was not selected to the final US roster for any international tournaments.

Personal life 

From 2016 to 2018, D'Oench worked for the New York County District Attorney, before leaving to become a field organiser for Amy McGrath, in her campaign for a seat in the US Congress. She is currently studying at Stanford Law School.

Career statistics

References

External links 
 

1994 births
Living people
American women's ice hockey forwards
Metropolitan Riveters players
Ice hockey players from New York (state)
Isobel Cup champions
Harvard Crimson women's ice hockey players
Harvard University alumni
American sportspeople of Japanese descent